Bethany Walsh (born 2 November 1985) is an Australian synchronized swimmer who competed in the 2008 Summer Olympics.

References

1985 births
Living people
Australian synchronised swimmers
Olympic synchronised swimmers of Australia
Synchronized swimmers at the 2008 Summer Olympics